Álvaro Rodrigues Vieira Júnior (born July 19, 1993) is a Brazilian football player who plays as a midfielder for Brusque.

Career statistics

Last update: end of 2018 season

References

External links

1993 births
Living people
Brazilian footballers
Brazilian expatriate footballers
Campeonato Brasileiro Série C players
Campeonato Brasileiro Série D players
J2 League players
Clube Atlético Mineiro players
Tupi Football Club players
América Futebol Clube (RN) players
Nacional Futebol Clube players
Associação Desportiva Confiança players
Montedio Yamagata players
Matsumoto Yamaga FC players
Association football midfielders
Brazilian expatriate sportspeople in Japan
Expatriate footballers in Japan
Footballers from São Paulo